This is a list of verifiably notable roadside attractions.

Asia

Thailand

 Great Buddha of Thailand

Europe

North America

Canada

Alberta 
 World's Largest Dinosaur, Drumheller, Alberta
Vegreville egg (Ukrainian Easter egg), Vegreville, Alberta

New Brunswick 

 World's largest axe, Nackawic, New Brunswick
 The World's Largest Lobster, Shediac, New Brunswick

Ontario 

 Big Apple, Cramahe, Ontario
 Big Nickel, Sudbury, Ontario

Manitoba 

 The World's Coke Can, Portage la Prairie, Manitoba

United States

Alabama 
World's Largest Office Chair, Anniston

California 
 World's Largest Hammer, Eureka
 World's largest paper cup, Riverside
 World's Tallest Thermometer, Baker

Georgia
 Big Chicken, Marietta

Illinois
 Brooks Catsup Bottle water tower, Collinsville
 World's largest windchime, Casey

Kansas
 Biggest ball of twine, Cawker City

Michigan
 Uniroyal Giant Tire, Allen Park
 Grand Haven Musical Fountain, Grand Haven

Minnesota 
 Biggest ball of twine (made by one man), Darwin
Iron Man, Chisholm
Pelican Pete, Pelican Rapids
Nevis Tiger Muskie, Nevis
Soudan Underground Mine State Park, Soudan

New Jersey

 Union Watersphere, Union (contested)
 Lucy the Elephant, Margate City

North Dakota
 World's Largest Buffalo, Jamestown

Ohio

Rhode Island
 Big Blue Bug, Providence

Washington
 Hat 'n' Boots, Seattle

West Virginia
 Chester teapot, Chester

Wisconsin

 Tallest Grandfather Clock, Kewaunee, Wisconsin

Oceania

Australia

New Zealand

See also
"Giants of the Prairies", a polka by the Kubasonics
List of gravity hills
Novelty architecture

References

Roadside attractions